The Hypocreales are an order of fungi within the class Sordariomycetes.  In 2008, it was estimated that it contained some 237 genera, and 2647 species in seven families.  Since then, a considerable number of further taxa have been identified, including an additional family, the Stachybotryaceae. 
Wijayawardene et al. in 2020 added more families and genera to the order.
According to the Catalog of Life,  the Hypocreales contains 6 families, 137 genera, and 1411 species.

Species of Hypocreales are usually recognized by their brightly colored, perithecial ascomata, or spore-producing structures. These are often yellow, orange or red.

Genera incertae sedis
According to a 2020 review of fungal classification, the following genera within the Hypocreales have an uncertain taxonomic placement (incertae sedis), and have not been assigned to any family:
Acremoniopsis  – 1 sp.
Andreaeana  - 1 sp.
Berkelella  – 2 spp.
Bulbithecium  – 1 sp.
Cephalosporiopsis  – 10 spp.
Chondronectria  – 1 sp.
Cylindronectria  – 1 sp.
Diploospora  – ca. 7 spp.
†Entropezites  – 1 sp.
Gynonectria  – 1 sp.
Hapsidospora  – 2 spp.
Haptospora  – 3 spp.
Illosporiopsis  – 1 sp.
Illosporium  – 17 spp.
Leptobarya  – 2 spp.
Metadothella  – 1 sp.
Munkia  – 4 spp.
†Mycetophagites  – 1 sp.
Neomunkia  – 1 sp.
Peloronectria  – 3 spp.
Pseudoacremonium  – 1 sp.
Pseudomeliola  – 10 spp.
Rodentomyces  – 1 sp.
Roselliniella  – 19 spp.
Saksenamyces  – 1 sp.
Sedecimiella  – 1 sp.
Stanjemonium  – 4 spp.
Stilbella  – 61 spp.
Ticonectria  – 3 spp.
Tilakidium  – 1 sp.

References

External links

 
Ascomycota orders
Taxa described in 1897
Taxa named by Gustav Lindau